The Heritage Bowl (formerly the Corsicana Bowl) is an NCAA Division II post-season college football bowl game held in Corsicana, Texas at Tiger Stadium. The game was established in 2017 by Antwone "Tony" Taulton. Since 2021 the title sponsor has been Fun Town RV.

It is one of four Division II sanctioned bowl games, all played annually on the first Saturday in December. The others are the Mineral Water Bowl (currently on hiatus), the Live United Texarkana Bowl, and the America's Crossroads Bowl. 

The two participating teams are selected from members of the Lone Star Conference, Mid-America Intercollegiate Athletics Association, and Great American Conference that do not qualify for the NCAA Division II Football Championship playoffs. The inaugural game was held on December 2, 2017 with Central Oklahoma defeating Tarleton State 38 to 31.

Game results

Wins by conference

Appearances by team

References

External links
 

College football bowls
NCAA Division II football